Ledo is a given name and a surname. It may refer to:

 Ledo Arroyo Torres (1894–1975), Uruguayan politician, Minister of Agriculture and Minister of National Defence
 Lêdo Ivo (1924-2012), Brazilian poet, novelist, essayist and journalist
 Japhet Ledo, former Moderator of the General Assembly of the Evangelical Presbyterian Church, Ghana (1993-2001)
 Joaquim Gonçalves Ledo (1781-1847), Brazilian journalist and politician
 Porfirio Muñoz Ledo (born 1933), Mexican politician
 Ricky Ledo (born 1992), Puerto Rican professional basketball player